The Minneapolis Thanksgiving Day fire destroyed two buildings, covering an entire block of Downtown Minneapolis on November 25–26, 1982: the 16-story headquarters of Northwestern National Bank (now Wells Fargo) and the vacant, partially demolished location formerly occupied by Donaldson's department store, which had recently moved across the street to the new City Center mall. Nobody was injured or killed as a result of the fire, though 10 firefighters were treated at hospitals.

The Minneapolis Fire Department quickly determined the cause of the fire as arson. Shortly thereafter, two juveniles were arrested for setting the fire, using an acetylene torch found at the partially demolished Donaldson's site. The charges were later dropped 

In 1988, Northwestern National Bank (then called Norwest Corporation) constructed a 57-story César Pelli-designed headquarters on the site of the Bank building. The new headquarters is now known as the Wells Fargo Center, after Norwest merged with Wells Fargo.  The Donaldson's half of the block is occupied by the Saks Fifth Avenue wing of Gaviidae Common, an upscale shopping mall.

About the Northwestern National Bank Building 

Northwestern National Bank was built in 1930 by the architecture firm of Graham, Anderson, Probst & White. The building had an open atrium through the upper floors, which acted as a chimney for the fire. Those upper 11-12 stories of the building were gutted by the fire. The bank vaults and safe deposit boxes, located in the basement and sub-basements, were undamaged in the fire, though they could not be reached and opened for several days.

Due to the severe damage to the structure resulting from the fire, it was imploded on March 11, 1984 to make way for the Norwest Center.

Damages 
The JCPenney's and IDS Tower buildings on adjacent blocks were connected by skyways, but firefighters were able to contain the fire and prevent it from reaching these buildings.  Smoke penetrated into them, and some windows burst from the heat, though they escaped serious damage.

Damages to the Donaldsons/Norwest block from the fire were estimated at $90 - $100 million, a jaw-dropping amount—about the same as the total of all fire damages in the city for the previous 15–20 years. The City budget was stressed by the heavy costs for firefighters and police called to the fire, and later costs to repair the street around the block.  At its peak, 85% of the Minneapolis Fire Department was battling this blaze, and fire crews from St. Paul and the Minneapolis–Saint Paul International Airport were called in to staff emptied fire stations around the city.

Weatherball 

The weatherball became such an icon that the bank even incorporated it into its advertising and logo for a time. After the Thanksgiving Day Fire and before the building was demolished, the weatherball was dismantled and stored at the Minnesota State Fairgrounds. The weatherball was never restored and, in 2000, it was scrapped.

References

1982 fires in the United States
Arson in Minnesota
Buildings and structures in Minneapolis
History of Minneapolis
1982 in Minnesota
Building and structure fires in the United States
November 1982 events in the United States
Commercial building fires
Chimney effect fires
High-rise fires